Gonçalo Byrne, GCIH (b. Alcobaça 1941) is a Portuguese architect.

Byrne is responsible for a vast accomplishment of architectural work, and has been awarded with many national and international prizes.

In 2005 he was awarded the title of Doctor Honoris Causa from the Lisbon Faculty of Architecture, Technical University of Lisbon, and was awarded the Grand Cross of the Order of Santiago da Espada by the President of the Portuguese Republic. Included in his diversified body of work, in terms of scale, theme and programme, the more relevant examples are the recent interventions in the Monastery of Alcobaça and its surrounding areas, the building for the Headquarters of the Government of the Province of Flemish Brabant in Leuven, Belgium, the Marine Traffic Control Tower for the Port of Lisbon Authority, the "Império" Quarter in the Chiado area of Lisbon, the Faro Theatre in the Algarve, and the National Museum Machado de Castro, in Coimbra, this latter project currently under construction.

Within the area of urban planning he carried out the Detailed Plans for the surrounding areas of the Ajuda National Palace, in Lisbon, for the Higher City University, in Coimbra, for the "Cava do Viriato" within the scope of the Polis Programme, in Viseu, as well as the Plan for the Town of Trancoso, this within the scope of the Programme for the Historical Villages of Portugal. He is currently developing relevant projects such as the Estoi Inn & Charm Hotel, in the Algarve, the Viseu Inn, the Estoril – Sol Building Complex, the "Jade" Building Complex in Lisbon, the New Central Laboratory for EPAL (Lisbon Water Distribution Company) and several single family villas in the Bom Sucesso Resort in Óbidos.

Works
 1974 - House in Chelas, Lisbon
 1975 - Casal das Figuieras housing complex (Saal Operation), Setúbal
 1977/90 Exhibition and sports centre, Braga
 1984 - New bank, Vidiguiera
 1992 - New bank, Arraiolos
 1983 - Housing for the Coociclo cooperative in Restelo, Lisbon
 1984 - Sa da Costa House in Alvalade, Lisbon
 1989 - Cesar Ferreira House, Alcanema
 1986 - Buildings on Piazza Luis de Camões, Vila do Conde
 1988 - Somincor House, Castro Verde

 1991 - Renovation of the Dona Maria II theatre, Lisbon
 1991 - Tourist complex, centre for oceanographic research and nautical club at Cais do Carvao, Funchal, Madeira
 1991 - Enlargement of the Institute of Social and Political Sciences, Technical University of Lisbon, Lisbon
 1991 - Uninova centre for environmental research, Almada
 1991 - Tomasio House, Setúbal
 1991 - Completion of the Ajuda National Palace, Lisbon
 1992 - Chancellor's office on the Aveiro University campus, Aveiro
 1992 - Marina of Lagos, Portugal
 1992 - Institute of Economics and Management of Lisbon - ISEG of Technical University of Lisbon, Lisbon
 1993 - Department of Mathematics and teaching facilities for the Faculty of Science and Technology in Lisbon
 1993 - Chemistry and Physics Department of the Faculty of Sciences, University of Lisbon Lisbon
 1993 - Housing, Hoeillaart (Belgium)
 1993 - Centre for chemical and biological technology, Oeiras
 1994 - Renovation of a block in the Chiado, Lisbon
 1995 - Experimental research laboratory for the Institute of Tropical Medicine, Lisbon
 1995 - Sports complex, Vila Do Conde
 1996 - Faculty of Computer Studies and Electronics at Polo II of University of Coimbra
 1997 - Parish buildings for the church in the Chelas valley, Lisbon

 1997 - VTS Tower - Maritime traffic coordination and control centre, Lisbon
 1998 - Headquarters of the Government of the Province of Flemish Brabant in Leuven, Belgium
 1999 - Headquarters of Banco Mais Bank, Lisbon

 2002 - Faro Theatre (Teatro das Figuras) Algarve, Portugal
 2002/? Forlanini park, Milan Italy
 2003/? Casa nel parco in Jesolo, Italy
 2004/? Single family villas in the Bom Sucesso Resort, Obidos, Portugal
 2004 - Extension and Spa of Quinta das Lagrimas Hotel, Coimbra
 2005 - Interventions in the Monastery of Alcobaça and its surrounding areas
 2008 - Interventions in the National Museum Machado de Castro, Coimbra
 2008 - Palace of Estoi to Pousadas de Portugal - Inn & Charm Hotel, Algarve
 2008 - Viseu old hospital to Pousadas de Portugal - Inn & Charm Hotel, Viseu

Awards
 1988 - National Architecture Prize, promoted by the order of Portuguese architects and the Ministry of Culture
 1988 - A.I.C.A.-S.E.C. critic's prize
 1993 - Prémio Nacional de Arquitectura
 1995 - Cross of Grand Officer of the Order of Infante D. Henrique by the President of the Portuguese Republic
 2000 - Gold Medal of the Academie d'Architecture de France
 2000 - Lisbon Valmor Prize
 2002 - International TECU Architecture Award
 2005 - Doctor Honoris Causa from the Lisbon Faculty of Architecture, Technical University
 2006 - Grand Cross of the Order of St. James of the Sword (Ordem Santiago da Espada) by the President of the Portuguese Republic

References

External links
 Gonçalo Byrne Site
 Brussels exhibition

20th-century Portuguese architects
21st-century Portuguese architects
1941 births
Living people